This is a list of the Norway national football team results from Norway's first international match in 1908 to 1929.

1900s

1908

1910s

1910

1911

1912

1913

1914

1915

1916

1917

1918

1919

1920s

1920

1921

1922

1923

1924

1925

1926

1927

1928

1929

Notes

References

External links
RSSSF
Reports for all matches of Norway national team

Norway national football team results